Bedrettin Tuncel (1910 in Tirebolu – 19 March 1980, in Ankara) was a former academic and a politician in Turkey.

Early life
Born in 1910 in Tirebolu of Giresun Province, he graduated from Galatasaray High School in 1932. For higher education he went to France to study French literature. He graduated from the Lumière University Lyon 2 in 1936. 
In Turkey he served in the Ankara University for 35 years. He also lectured on the history of Art in the conservatory of Ankara for 10 years. After 27 July 1963 he served as the speaker of Turkish National Committee of UNESCO

Political life
After 1960 Turkish coup d'etat in addition to his academic works, he was also appointed as the  representative of universities in the Constituent Assembly of Turkey. In the 24th government of Turkey he served as the Minister of National Education.  But during the democratic regime after 1961, he returned to his academic life.

Books
He is the author of the following books. He also translated books from French.
 Seçme Yazılar ("Selected Essays"), İstanbul:Yapı Kredi Yayınları 
Tiyatro Tarihi (History of theatre), 1938
 Mahatma Gandi, 1869-1948 (1969)
 Fransızca'da Yunus Emre (Yunus Emre in French language),1971
 Atatürk ve 30 Ağustos Zaferi'nin İlk Kutlanışı (Atatürk and the First celebration of the 30th of August Victory),1972
 Büyük Zafer ve Afyonkarahisar (Great Victory and Afyonkarahisar),1972
 Nikola Kopernik, 1473-1973 (1973),
 Dimitrie Cantemir 1673-1724 (1975),
 Romanya'nın Sesi (Voice of Romania), 1979

He also translated books from French.

References

1910 births
1980 deaths
Ministers of National Education of Turkey
People from Tirebolu
Academic staff of Ankara University
Turkish writers